Tina Wildberger is an American politician who is currently the Hawaii state representative in Hawaii's 11th district. She won the seat after incumbent Democrat Kaniela Ing decided to run for Hawaii's 1st congressional district in the United States House of Representatives. She won re-election in 2020 against Aloha ʻĀina Party candidate Howard Greenburg, 74.2% to 25.8%.

Wildberger announced in April 2022 that she will not run for re-election in the 2022 Hawaii House of Representatives election, and will leave office at the end of her term.

References

Democratic Party members of the Hawaii House of Representatives
21st-century American politicians
21st-century American women politicians
Georgia State University alumni
Living people
Year of birth missing (living people)